Conganige Joseph Malsi Jackson Anthony (born July 8, 1958, as ජැක්සන් ඇන්තනී), commonly known as Jackson Anthony, is an actor in Sri Lankan cinema, theater and television. One of the most popular artists in Sri Lanka, Anthony won the award for the Best Actor for record sixteen times. Primarily active as an actor all three media, he has appeared before the public in versatile forms; director, producer, singer, screenwriter, television host, novelist, columnist, lyricist, historian and traveller.

Family background
Jackson was born on 8 July 1958 in Podiwee Kumbura village, Ragama, Sri Lanka. While he's recognized as "Jackson" by many people, his parents used to call him "Malsi". He received his primary education at Hapugoda St. Mary's Junior School and St. Mary's College in Bandarawela and later entered Galahitiyawa Central College in Ganemulla. For higher education he attended the University of Colombo where he first obtained an honors degree in Sinhala language and Literature and did his master's degree in Mass media at University of Sri Jayewardenepura.

He often remembers his father, Konganige Benedict Anthony and his mother Podivee Kumbure Rolin Perera as the mammoth pillar of his success. Jackson's parents lived in his hometown Podiweekumbura, Ragama. His grandfather was Peduru Anthony, who worked as an overseer at Ceylon Electricity Board. He hails from a family of 5 brothers. Elder Brother is Senaka Titus Anthony who is a journalist for several medias. And his other brothers are Sudath Anthony, Saman Anthony, and Mohan Anthony. On 23 October 2017 in Singapore, his elder brother Senaka Titus died due to kidney and liver failure.

Anthony is married to his long time partner Kumari Munasinghe, who is also an actress and a singer. They have two sons and a daughter and the family is settled in Kadawatha, a Colombo suburb. The daughter is the eldest of three siblings, Madhavee Wathsala, is a television presenter, actress and a singer. The elder son, Akila Dhanuddara, also is a television presenter, model and an actor. His youngest son, Sajitha Anuththara is also a television presenter, singer and award-winning actor who has played the role of the hunter's son inSooriya Arana. Sajitha is a graduate at University of Kelaniya. He has also played the title role in his father's big-budget film Aba. All three children celebrated their wedding ceremony on 18 January 2019. Madhavee was previously married to doctor Aloka Liyanage, son of veteran actor Hemasiri Liyanage in 2014. However they divorced in 2016. Madhavee is currently married to Milan. Akila is married to Emy and the couple has one child. Sajitha is married to Buwanika.

He is a Catholic but enthusiast of Buddhist studies. He conducts a show on Sri Lankan Buddhist history and a discussion program on the Buddhist channel.

Drama career
He acted extensively in several stage dramas in university stage. Then he performed in the Neville Dias Subasinghe's Vaaruwen Yana Minissu and Manavayo as well as E. M. D. Upali's Methanin Maruwenu. Then he performed in many popular stage plays such as Marasad, Madhura Jawanika, Loma Hansa, Dhawala Beeshana, Ath, Mora and Tharavo Igilethi brought him island wide recognition in the field of cinema. He was also the Best Actor at the National Drama Festival.

In 1993 he came to film industry. Having acted in Guru Gedara, Chitti, Ayoma and Loku Duwa, in his initial days, Jackson went on to prove his status in films like Bawa Duka, Bawa Karma, Gini Awi Saha Gini Keli, Aswesuma, Agni Dahaya, Sooriya Arana, Mille Soya and Randiya Dahara. In the meantime, he came to terms with television as well. These fields helped him establish his own identity as an actor. Some of his most popular television roles came through the serials: Palingu Manike, Ella Langa Walawwa, Suseema, Weda Hamine, Kadulla, Pitagamgarayo and Akala Sandya. Of these, he won the award for the Best Actor at the Sumathi Awards for his performance in the serial Pitagamkarayo. In the movie Tharanaya, he played the role of a train man named "Thangappan" and practiced dark magic. He learned low country dance from Sedaraman Gurunnance of Handapangoda for his performance in the film Bawa Duka. He learned the difference between a hunter and a shooter while acting for the film Sooriya Arana.

In 1992, he directed his maiden teledrama Esala Kaluwara. In 1990, a drama festival called 'Bhumika 7' featured seven of Anthony's best plays which allowed scholarly fans to experience Jackson's wide range of theatrics. Then in 2014, he made second teledrama direction Daskon which later won several awards at several local award festivals. During his acting career he has garnered more than 20 Best Actor Awards at local award ceremonies such as Sarasavi Awards, Presidential Awards and OCIC Awards.

He has also directed several blockbuster Sri Lankan films. His directorial debut, Julietge Bhumikawa won him the award for the Most Promising Director at the Critics' Awards Ceremony. Paradeesaya was another film directed by him which was critically acclaimed. His direction Aba, allegedly an expensive movie have been made in Sri Lanka has been awarded in many film festivals. He won award for the Best Actor in Derana Film Awards 2015 for the film Address Na, which was directed by him. In 2017, he joined with a Kerala cinema production Lucknow directed by Anil Kumar along with another Sri Lankan Piumi Hansamali.

Stage drama
Bera Handa
Ath
Oththukaraya
Methanin Maruwenu
Lomahansa
Tharavo Igilethi 
Madhura Javanika
Maha Samayama
Dhawala Bheeshana

Songs
 Sithe Susum Niwana Gayana performed with Clarence Wijewardena
 Dasa Piya Gath Kala Mata performed with Clarence Wijewardena
 Lande Ukula Uda performed with wife Kumari Munasinghe
 Bandara Deiyo Tele Drama theme Song
 Dewathawan sithana dewal performed with Clarence Wijewardena
 Ra Ra Tharakawo performed with Clarence Wijewardena
 Ahasa Polowa Uhulanawalu with his family members

Other careers
Anthony was the Winner of the Peoples' award for the best artist at the Awards Ceremony of the Sri Lanka Institute of Marketing (SLIM) 2007. Jackson Anthony served as the Creative Director of Swarnavahini in early 2000s and produced popular musical program Hapan Padura. He is acclaimed for his concept and presentation of Maha Sinhalaye Vansa Kathawa (translated as The Chronicle of the Great Sinhalese) and Maha Sinhalaye Yatath Vijitha Vansa Kathawa, telecast through Swarnavahini for several years. Other popular programs created by him include exploratory programs like Awaare Siripa, Ganga Dige, an exploration of the water bodies in the island around Mahaweli River), Roma Puranaya, a travel program revealing the history and civilization of Italy and Salang Hanthe, a travel program revealing the history and civilization of Lesotho).

In addition cinema, he worked with Clarence Wijewardena; one of the most respected Sri Lankan musicians in Sinhalese music, as a supporting singer for a Sinhala teledrama called Suseema. He sang two popular songs with Clarence, Sithe Susum and Desa Piya Gathkala.

Anthony is one of three judges of Sri Lanka's Got Talent reality program, which is telecast on Sirasa TV. In January 2020, he launched his book Kanda Uda Gindara. On 22 July 2020, he started the second travelling documentary along the Kalu Ganga titled Kalu Ganga Dige.

Accident
On 2 July 2022, Anthony along with his younger brother Saman Anthony and a friend have been hospitalized following an accident at Thalawa in Anuradhapura after the vehicle they were travelling in collided with a wild elephant at Thalawa. The incident took place when he was coming in his cab after taking part in the shooting of the movie Singhabahu directed by Dr. Somaratne Dissanayake. He was admitted to the Anuradhapura Teaching Hospital on the same day and to the Emergency Department of the Colombo National Hospital on the morning of July 3. At the Colombo National hospital, he underwent a seven-hour surgery in the intensive care unit.

Filmography

As actor

As director

Awards

"Gampaha 80" Drama Festival

|-
|| 1980 |||  || Best Actor || 
|-
|| 1980 |||  || Best Script || 
|-
|| 1980 |||  || Best Production ||

National Drama Festival

|-
|| 1983 ||| Methanin Maruwenu || Best Supporting Actor || 
|-
|| 1986 ||| Maratsade || Best Actor ||

Divaina Sama Drama Festival 

|-
|| 1987 ||| Maratsade || Best Actor ||

Wijaya Rupavahini Awards

|-
|| 1987 ||| Kadulla || Best Actor ||

UNDA Awards

|-
|| 1991 ||| Kadulla || Best Actor || 
|-
|| 1992 ||| Mahamera Pamula || Best Script || 
|-
|| 1996 ||| Akhala Sandyaa || Award of Excellence for Acting ||

Sumathi Awards

|-
|| 1997 ||| Pitagamkarayo || Best Actor || 
|-
|| 2002 ||| Maha Sinhale Wansakathawa || Award of Excellence for Media || 
|-
|| 2004 ||| Yeheli || The Best Current Event || 
|-
|| 2008 ||| Ganga Dige || The Best Magazine Program || 
|-
|| 2008 ||| Neighbor Talks || Award of Excellence for Media || 
|-
|| 2016 ||| Daskon || Best Teledrama || 
|-
|| 2016 ||| Daskon || Best Teledrama Director || 
|-
|| 2016 ||| Daskon || Best Teledrama Script || 
|-
|| 2018 ||| See Raja || Best Teledrama Director || 
|-
|| 2018 ||| See Raja || Best Teledrama Script ||

Mass Media Awards

|-
|| 2006 ||| Maha Sinhale Wansakathawa || The Best Television Programme || 
|-
|| 2006 |||  || The Best Television Presenter ||

Critic Awards

|-
|| 1995 ||| Punuruppaththiya || Best Actor || 
|-
|| 1996 ||| Julietge Bhoomikawa || Most Promoting Director || 
|-
|| 1997 ||| Gini Awi Saha Gini Keli || Best Actor ||

SIGNIS OCIC Awards

|-
|| 1996 ||| Loku Duwa || Best Actor || 
|-
|| 1997 ||| Bawa Karma & Bawa Duka || Best Actor || 
|-
|| 2002 ||| Agnidaahaya || Outstanding Performance || 
|-
|| 2005 ||| Randiya Dahara || Outstanding Performance || 
|-
|| 2005 ||| Garilla Marketing || Outstanding Performance ||

Sarasaviya Awards

|-
|| 1996 ||| Ayoma || Merit Awards || 
|-
 1997 ||| Bawa Duka || Best Actor || 
|-
|| 2004 ||| Randiya Dahara || Best Actor || 
|-
|| 2005 ||| Milla Soya || Best Supporting Actor || 
|-
|| 2015 ||| Maharaja Gemunu || Best Actor ||

Presidential Awards

|-
|| 1997 ||| Julietge Bhoomikawa || Special Jury Awards || 
|-
|| 1997 ||| Bawa Duka || Best Actor || 
|-
|| 1998 ||| Gini Awi Saha Gini Keli || Best Actor || 
|-
|| 1998 ||| Aswesuma || Best Actor || 
|-
|| 2001 ||| Sooriya Arana || Best Actor || 
|-
|| 2005 ||| Garilla Marketing || Best Actor ||

Top Ten Awards

|-
|| 1997 ||| Agnidaahaya || Cultural Achievement ||

People's Awards

|-
|| 2007 || People's vote || People's Artist of the Year || 
|-
|| 2007 || Aba || People's Film of the Year ||

Raigam Tele'es Awards

|-
|| 2014 ||| Appachchi || Best Actor || 
|-
|| 2015 ||| Daskon || Best Drama Script || 
|-
|| 2015 ||| Daskon || Best Drama Direction || 
|-
|| 2015 ||| Daskon || Best Teledrama of the Year ||

Lux Derana Film Awards

|-
|| 2016 ||| Address Na || Best Actor || 
|-
|| 2018 ||| Dharmayuddhaya || Best Actor || 
|-
|| 2019 |||  || Most Popular Actor ||

Hiru Golden Film Awards

|-
|| 2016 ||| Maharaja Gemunu || Jury's Award of Excellence ||

Asian Film Festival

|-
|| 2019 ||| Vishama Bhaga || Best Actor ||

Fox International Film Festival

|-
|| 2020 ||| Vishama Bhaga || Best Supporting Actor  ||

References
 SLMDb of Jackson Anthony
 Official Website of Jackson Anthony
 
 Swarnavahini TV Channel

Notes

External links
Jackson Anthony's Biography in Sinhala Cinema Database

Articles
මම කවදහරි මැරෙන්නෙ කලාකරුවෙකු හැටියට
"He is better than others"
ජැක්සන්ට ලැබුණු ලොකුම උපන්දින තෑග්ග
නව යුවළත්‍රයට 'සරසවිය' සුබපැතුම්
 ජැක්සන්ගේ මුල්ම විදෙස් සම්මානය රැගෙන එයි
 කුණාටුව අහවර වනතුරු මම කුඹගහ බදාගෙන ඉන්නවා
 මාධ්‍ය තුනේම හොඳම නළුවා ජැක්සන් ඇන්තනී

Sri Lankan male film actors
Living people
Alumni of the University of Colombo
Alumni of the University of Sri Jayewardenepura
Sinhalese singers
1949 births
Sinhalese male actors
Kala Keerthi